Lotus (formerly, Marshall and Uniontown) is an unincorporated community in El Dorado County, California, United States.

The settlement was established in 1849 and named for James W. Marshall, discoverer of gold. In 1850, the name was changed to Uniontown to commemorate California's admission to the Union. The name was changed to Lotus with the arrival of the post office in 1881.

References

Unincorporated communities in California
Unincorporated communities in El Dorado County, California
Populated places established in 1849
1849 establishments in California